Tragano (Greek, Modern: Τραγανό, Ancient/Katharevousa: -on) is a town and a former municipality in Elis, West Greece, Greece. Since the 2011 local government reform it is part of the municipality Pineios, of which it is a municipal unit. The municipal unit has an area of 41.475 km2. Tragano is situated in a flat, rural area, north of the river Pineios. It is 2 km east of Stafidokampos, 4 km east of Andravida, 3 km north of Agia Mavra, 5 km northwest of Avgeio and 8 km northeast of Gastouni. It is 2 km southeast of the Andravida Air Base.

Subdivisions
The municipal unit Tragano is subdivided into the following communities:
Tragano
Agia Mavra
Simiza

The community Tragano consists of the town Tragano (population 2,509 in 2011) and the small villages Markopoulo, Olga and Pigadi. Markopoulo is 1 km east of Tragano town centre. Its population was 125 in 2011. Olga is 3 km east of Tragano, and its population was 672 in 2011. Pigadi is 7 km east of Tragano, population 41 in 2011.

Historical population

See also

List of settlements in Elis

References

Populated places in Elis